José Luis Jaimerena (born 12 May 1960 in Elizondo) is a Spanish former racing cyclist and current directeur sportif for .

Major results
1982
 1st Prologue Cinturón a Mallorca

References

External links 

1960 births
Living people
Spanish male cyclists
Movistar Team (men's team)
People from Baztán (comarca)
Cyclists from Navarre